Shah Azizur Rahman (1925–1989) was a Bangladeshi politician who served as the Prime Minister of Bangladesh.

Shah Azizur Rahman may also refer to
 Shah Azizur Rahman (1925–1989), Prime Minister of Bangladesh
 Shah Azizur Rahman (politician) (died 2018), Bangladesh Awami League politician and former Member of Parliament from Sylhet-2

See also 
 Azizur Rahman (disambiguation)